This is a list of artists who performed at Live 8.

Park Place, Barrie
 African Guitar Summit
 Barenaked Ladies
 Blue Rodeo
 Bruce Cockburn
 Bryan Adams
 Buckcherry
 Celine Dion
 Dan Aykroyd (Host)
 DMC
 Deep Purple
 DobaCaracol
 Snoop Dogg

 Great Big Sea
 Jann Arden
 Jet
 K'naan
 Les Trois Accords
 Mötley Crüe
 Neil Young
 Our Lady Peace
 Pegi Young
 Randy Bachman (and The Carpet Frogs)
 Sam Roberts
 Simple Plan
 Tom Cochrane
 Tom Green (Host)
 Tragically Hip

Siegessäule, Berlin
 a-ha
 Sasha
 Anne Will (Host)
 Audioslave
 BAP
 Brian Wilson
 Chris de Burgh
 Claudia Schiffer (Host, also appeared in Edinburgh)
 Daniel Powter
 Die Toten Hosen
 Faithless
 Green Day
 Herbert Grönemeyer (also appeared in Edinburgh)
 Joana Zimmer
 Juan Diego Flórez
 Juli
 Katherine Jenkins (also appeared in Edinburgh)
 Michael Mittermeier (Host)
 Otto
 Phil Collins
 Reamonn
 Renee Olstead
 Roxy Music
 Silbermond
 Söhne Mannheims
 Wir sind Helden

Japan
 Björk
 Def Tech
 Do As Infinity
 Dreams Come True
 Good Charlotte
 McFly (also appeared in Edinburgh)
 Rize

Cornwall - "Africa Calling", Eden Project
 Akim El Sikameya
 Angelina Jolie (Host)
 Angelique Kidjo
 Ayub Ogada
 Chartwell Dutiro
 Coco Mbassi
 Daara J
 Dido
 Emmanuel Jal
 Frititi
 Geoffrey Oryema
 Johnny Kalsi (Host)
 Kanda Bongo Man
 Mariza
 Maryam Mursal
 Modou Diouf
 O Fogum
 Peter Gabriel (Host)
 Shikisha
 Siyaya
 Thomas Mapfumo & the Blacks Unlimited
 Tinariwen
 Uno
 Youssou N'Dour

Edinburgh
 1 Giant Leap
 Annie Lennox (also appeared in London)
 Beverley Knight
 Bob Geldof (also appeared in London)
 Bono (presenter, also appeared with his band U2 at London)
 Campino
 Chris Barrie (presenter, also appeared in London)
 Chris Evans
 Claudia Schiffer (presenter, also appeared in Berlin)
 Coumi Nidu (presenter)
 Davina McCall (presenter)
 Eddie Izzard (presenter, also accompanied Midge Ure)
 Embrace
 Feeder
 Geoffrey Oryema
 George Clooney (presenter)
 Harriet Thorpe (also appeared in London)
 Herbert Grönemeyer (also appeared in Berlin)
 James Brown
 Jamie Cullum
 Jill Greenacre (also appeared in London)
 Katherine Jenkins (also appeared in Berlin)
 Lenny Henry (presenter, also appeared in London)
 Maxi Jazz
 Mahotella Queens 
 McFly (also appeared in Tokyo)
 Mike Burns (also appeared in London)
 Midge Ure
 Natasha Bedingfield
 Nelson Mandela (also appeared in Johannesburg)
 Neneh Cherry
 Pippa Haywood (also appeared in London)
 Peter Kay (presenter, also appeared in London)
 Ronan Keating
 Russell Porter (also appeared in London)
 Snow Patrol (also appeared in London)
 Sugababes
 Susan Sarandon (presenter)
 Texas
 The Corrs
 The Proclaimers
 The Thrills
 Tim Marriott (also appeared in London)
 Travis (also appeared in London)
 Wangari Maathai (presenter)
 Wet Wet Wet
 Will Young

Johannesburg - Mary Fitzgerald Square
 4Peace Ensemble
 Jabu Khanyile & Bayete
 Lindiwe
 Lucky Dube
 Mahotella Queens
 Malaika
 Nelson Mandela (Host)
 Orchestra Baobab
 Oumou Sangare
 Vusi Mahlasela
 Zola

London - Hyde Park
Performers
 African Children's Choir
 Annie Lennox
 Coldplay
 David Baddiel
 Dido
 Elton John
 Frank Skinner
 George Michael (appeared with Paul McCartney and sung 'Drive My Car')
 Hunterz & The Dhol Blasters
 Joss Stone
 Keane
 Madonna
 Mariah Carey
 Ms. Dynamite
 Paul McCartney
 Pete Doherty
 Peter Kay (presenter)
 Pink Floyd
 R.E.M.
 Razorlight
 Richard Ashcroft
 Robbie Williams
 Scissor Sisters
 Snoop Dogg
 Snow Patrol
 Stereophonics
 Sting
 The Killers
 The Who
 Travis
 U2
 UB40
 Velvet Revolver
 Youssou N'Dour

Presenters included:
 Bill Gates, Birhan Woldu, Bob Geldof, Brad Pitt, Chris Barrie, David Beckham, David Walliams, Dawn French, Jonathan Ross, Kofi Annan, Lenny Henry, Matt Lucas, Ricky Gervais, Steve Brooks & Vincent Reynolds.

Appeared in Chris Barrie comedy sketch:
Andi Peters, Andy Townsend, Anouschka Menzies, Barry Killerby, David Beckham, Denis Irwin, Don Austen, Emma Ledden, Emma Forbes, Frank Stapleton, Gareth Southgate, Gary Lineker, Gary McFadden, Harriet Thorpe, Harrison Oldroyd, Heather Suttie, Geoff Hurst, George Cohen, Jack Charlton, Jamie Theakston, Jason McAteer, Jill Greenacre, John Aldridge, John Barrowman, John Eccleston, Julia St. John, Katy Hill, Kenny Cunningham, Kevin Keegan, Kevin Moran, Martin Peters, Matt Le Tissier, Mike Burns, Mitch Johnson, Norman Hunter, Ortis Deley, Packie Bonner, Peter Shilton, Peter Simon, Pippa Haywood, Ray Houghton, Ron Atkinson, Ron Harris, Ronnie Whelan, Russell Porter, Sarah Cawood, Stephen Churchett, Steve Staunton, Steve Wilson, Thomas Sangster, Tim Marriott, Trevor and Simon, Trey Farley & Zoe Ball.

Moscow - Red Square
 Agata Kristi
 Alyona Sviridova
 Bi-2
 Bravo
 Dolphin
 Garik Sukachev
 Jungo
 Linda
 Moral Code X
 Pet Shop Boys
 Red Elvises
 Splean
 Valery Syutkin

Paris - Chateau de Versailles
 Alpha Blondy
 Amel Bent
 Andrea Bocelli with the Philarmonie der Nationen
 Axelle Red
 Calogero
 Cerrone & Nile Rodgers
 Craig David
 David Hallyday
 Diam's & Amel Bent
 Dido
 Faudel
 Florent Pagny (with Patricia Petitbon)
 Kyo
 Laurent Boyer (presenter)
 Louis Bertignac
 M pokora
 Magic System
 Muse
 Passi
 Placebo
 Raphael
 Shakira
 Solidarite Sida (presenter)
 The Cure
 Tina Arena
 Yannick Noah
 Youssou N'Dour
 Zucchero (also appeared in Rome)

Philadelphia - Benjamin Franklin Parkway
Performers
 Alicia Keys
 Black Eyed Peas
 Black Ice
 Bon Jovi
 Britney Spears
 Dave Matthews Band
 Def Leppard
 Destiny's Child
 DJ Green Lantern
 DJ Jazzy Jeff
 Don McLean
 Eagles
 Jars of Clay
 Jay-Z
 Josh Groban
 Kaiser Chiefs
 Kanye West
 Keith Urban
 Kelsey Grammer
 Lemon
 Linkin Park
 Maroon 5
 Neil Diamond
 Rita Marley
 Rob Thomas
 Sarah McLachlan
 Simon & Garfunkel
 Stephen Marley
 Stevie Wonder
 Suzi Quatro
 Toby Keith
 Will Smith

Presenters
 Bob Costas, Chris Tucker, David Hyde Pierce, David Koechner, Dhani Jones, Don Cheadle, Jack Nicholson, Jennifer Connelly, Jimmy Smits, Kami, Naomi Watts, Natalie Portman, Oprah Winfrey, Paul Rudd, Richard Gere, Seth MacFarlane, Steve Carell, Will Ferrell & Will Smith (Main Host)

Rome - Circus Maximus
 Alex Britti
 Antonello Venditti
 Articolo 31
 Biagio Antonacci
 Cesare Cremonini
 Claudio Baglioni
 Duran Duran
 Elisa
 Faith Hill
 Fiorella Mannoia
 Francesco De Gregori
 Francesco Renga
 Gemelli Diversi
 Irene Grandi
 Jane Alexander (presenter)
 Jovanotti
 Laura Pausini
 Le Vibrazioni
 Ligabue
 Mayor of Lampedusa (presenter)
 Pagani & African Drum Collective
 Max Pezzali
 Meg
 Negramaro
 Negrita
 Nek
 Noa
 L'Orchestra di Piazza Vittorio
 Paola Cortellesi (presenter)
 Piero Pelù
 Pino Daniele
 Planet Funk
 Povia
 Renato Zero
 Ron
 Spandau Ballet
 Stefano Senardi
 Tim McGraw
 Tiromancino
 Velvet
 Zucchero (also appeared in Paris)

Live 8
Lists of 21st-century people
Live 8
Artists